California's 9th State Senate district is one of 40 California State Senate districts. It is currently represented by Democrat Nancy Skinner of Berkeley.

District profile 
The district encompasses the northern East Bay, stretching along the eastern shores of San Francisco Bay and San Pablo Bay. It forms the focal point of the East Bay, centered on Oakland, the third largest city in the San Francisco Bay Area.

Alameda County – 45.9%
 Alameda
 Albany
 Berkeley
 Emeryville
 Oakland
 Piedmont
 San Leandro – 91.1%

Contra Costa County – 23.5%
 El Cerrito
 Hercules
 Pinole
 Richmond
 San Pablo

Election results from statewide races

List of senators 
Due to redistricting, the 9th district has been moved around different parts of the state. The current iteration resulted from the 2011 redistricting by the California Citizens Redistricting Commission.

Election results

2020

2016

2012

2008

2004

2000

1998 (special)

1996

1992

See also 
 California State Senate
 California State Senate districts
 Districts in California

References

External links 
 District map from the California Citizens Redistricting Commission

09
Government of Alameda County, California
Government of Contra Costa County, California

Alameda, California
Albany, California
Government of Berkeley, California
Emeryville, California
Oakland, California
Piedmont, California
San Leandro, California
El Cerrito, California
Hercules, California
Pinole, California
Richmond, California
San Pablo, California
Government in the San Francisco Bay Area